Los Verdes (Spanish: "the greens") may refer to:
 Confederation of the Greens
 Los Verdes de la Comunidad de Madrid
 Los Verdes-Izquierda Verde

See also 
 Las verdes praderas